Henry Skinner may refer to:

 Henry Skinner (businessman), Australian businessman
 Henry Skinner (cricketer) (born 1921), Barbadian cricketer
 Henry Skinner (judge), British barrister and judge 
 Henry Alan Skinner (born 1899), Canadian anatomist and classical scholar
 Harry Skinner (ethnologist) (1886–1978), New Zealand ethnologist
 Hank Skinner (1962–2023), American convicted murderer